Hesar (also Romanized as Ḩeşār; also known as Ḩeẕār) is a village in Holayjan Rural District, in the Central District of Izeh County, Khuzestan Province, Iran. At the 2006 census, its population was 62, in 11 families.

References 

Populated places in Izeh County